is a song by Japanese rock band Asian Kung-Fu Generation. It was released as the first single of their major-label debut album, Kimi Tsunagi Five M, on August 6, 2003.  In 2020, this song was used for promotional anime video for horse race event, 65th Arima Kinen, with original characters then became anime Fanfare of Adolescence. The song's b-side, "Entrance," was later included on the band's 2006 compilation, Feedback File.

Music video
The music video for "Mirai no Kakera" was directed by Suguru Takeuchi. The PV features the band performing the song in a pitch-black environment. As they play, a mysterious woman wearing a hideously cartoonish, cardboard mask resembling Gotoh's face dances to the song.

Track listing

Personnel
Masafumi Gotoh – lead vocals, rhythm guitar
Kensuke Kita – lead guitar, background vocals
Takahiro Yamada –  bass, background vocals
Kiyoshi Ijichi – drums
Asian Kung-Fu Generation – producer
Yusuke Nakamura – single cover art

Charts

References

Asian Kung-Fu Generation songs
2003 debut singles
Songs written by Masafumi Gotoh
2003 songs
Ki/oon Music singles